IP5 may refer to:

 Internet Stream Protocol, a derivative of IPv5 and intended successor to IPv4, currently being replaced by IPv6
 Inositol pentakisphosphate, a molecule derived from inositol tetrakisphosphate
 Itinerários Principais (Principal Routes) 5, a road in Portugal
 "Intersection Point IP5", co-located with TOTEM at the Large Hadron Collider at CERN
 IP5 (intellectual property offices), the five largest intellectual property offices in the world
 Fifth-order intercept point, a measure of linearity in amplifiers and mixers